Thái Bình river (Vietnamese: Sông Thái Bình) is the name of the Thái Bình river system's main river in Northern Vietnam. This river system joins with the Red River system and brings alluvium to create Red River Delta.

Thái Bình river starts in the area of Đồng Phúc commune, Yên Dũng District, Bắc Giang Province -  where the Thuong River and Cầu River join with each other. It then flows to Hải Dương Province and becomes the boundary between Bắc Giang and Hải Dương. After flowing through the area of Hải Dương, it enters Thái Bình Province and flows to the South China Sea at Ba Lat river mouth.

The total length of the main river is about 

Rivers of Thái Bình province
Rivers of Bắc Giang province
Rivers of Hải Dương province
Rivers of Vietnam